Line 9 or 9 Line may refer to:

Asia

China
Line 9 (Beijing Subway), a subway line in Beijing
Line 9 (Chengdu Metro), a metro line in Chengdu, Sichuan
Line 9 (Chongqing Rail Transit), a metro line in Chongqing
Line 9 (Guangzhou Metro), a metro line in Guangzhou, Guangdong
Line 9 (Hangzhou Metro), a metro line in Hangzhou, Zhejiang
Line 9 (Shanghai Metro), a metro line in Shanghai
Line 9 (Shenyang Metro), a metro line in Shenyang, Liaoning
Line 9 (Shenzhen Metro), a metro line in Shenzhen, Guangdong
Line 9 (Tianjin Metro), a metro line in Tianjin
Line 9 (Xi'an Metro), a metro line in Xi'an, Shaanxi

India
 Line 9 (Mumbai Metro)

Malaysia
 Sungai Buloh-Kajang Line, called Line 9 at route map

Philippines
Metro Manila Subway Line 9, Metro Manila

South Korea
Seoul Subway Line 9, a subway line in Seoul

Europe

France
Paris Métro Line 9, one of 16 metro lines in Paris

Italy
Line 9 (Naples Metro), rapid transit railway line that forms part of the Metropolitana di Napoli

Russia
Line 9 (Moscow Metro), a metro line of the Moscow Metro, Moscow

Spain
Barcelona Metro line 9, one of the two branches of the Barcelona metro extension line 9/10
Line 9 (Madrid Metro)

North America

Mexico
Mexico City Metro Line 9, a rapid transit line in Mexico City

United States
9 (New York City Subway service)
Route 9 (Baltimore), a bus route
9 (Los Angeles Railway)

South America

Brazil
Line 9 (CPTM), São Paulo

Chile
Santiago Metro Line 9, a planned railway line